The 1897–98 Brown men's ice hockey season was the inaugural season of play for the program.

Season
For Brown's first ice hockey season all games were played on the road. The travel schedule was rather light, however, as the furthest they has to travel was New York City. The Bears finished with a very good record of 4–1–1 and, with their only loss coming against a non-collegiate opponent, the Bears could lay claim to the Intercollegiate championship (though there were few active college programs).

First game
Often cited as the "first game of intercollegiate ice hockey played in the United States" is the contest against Harvard on January 19, 1898 at Franklin Park, Boston. Students from Brown took the train to Boston, where they met with some students from Harvard. They commandeered a patch of a frozen pond in Franklin Park, asked pleasure skaters to move aside, set up some poles to mark the goals, and played the game of ice hockey they had learned in Canada. The details and outcome of the game were recorded in the following day's Boston Herald: Brown 6, Harvard 0.

Mascot
Brown University did not formally adopt the Bear as its mascot until the fall of 1905.

Roster

Standings

Schedule and Results

|-
!colspan=12 style=";" | Regular Season

References

Brown Bears men's ice hockey seasons
Brown
Brown
Brown
Brown